DaMon William "Monti" Davis (born July 26, 1958 – June 4, 2013) was an American professional basketball player. He was a 6'7" (201 cm) 205 lb (93 kg) forward and played collegiately at Tennessee State University.

Davis was selected with the 21st pick of the first round of the 1980 NBA draft by the Philadelphia 76ers. In his only NBA season (1980–81), he played one game each for the Sixers and the Dallas Mavericks, tallying a total of 3 points and 4 rebounds.

See also
List of NCAA Division I men's basketball players with 30 or more rebounds in a game
List of NCAA Division I men's basketball season rebounding leaders

References

External links
NBA stats @ basketballreference.com

1958 births
2013 deaths
African-American basketball players
American men's basketball players
Basketball players from Ohio
Dallas Mavericks players
Philadelphia 76ers draft picks
Philadelphia 76ers players
Small forwards
Sportspeople from Warren, Ohio
Tennessee State Tigers basketball players
20th-century African-American sportspeople
21st-century African-American people